Periclimenes, commonly known as glass shrimp or cleaner shrimp, is a commensal and often symbiotic genus of semi-transparent shrimp within the family Palaemonidae. Species of this large genus feature a wide variety of coloration and patterns, widespread distribution throughout much of the world's tropical oceans, and are often sought out for aquarium trade.

Taxonomy 
This genus has undergone several changes in classification based on recent molecular studies comparing species within the genus.  However, most recent molecular studies have only involved approximately 20% of the known species likely to belong to the genus.  Additionally, most of the molecular studies performed involved Indo-Pacific species of Periclimenes and did not include presumed Periclimenes found in the Atlantic Ocean. Periclimenes has previously been suggested as being a polyphyletic taxa, and has already undergone splits into several new genera.  It is likely the genus will undergo changes in classification in coming years with further research.

The genus contains the following species:
Periclimenes acanthimerus Bruce, 2006
Periclimenes aegylios Grippa & d'Udekem d'Acoz, 1996
Periclimenes affinis (Zehntner, 1894)
Periclimenes albatrossae Chace & Bruce, 1993
Periclimenes albolineatus Bruce & Coombes, 1997
Periclimenes alcocki Kemp, 1922
Periclimenes aleator Bruce, 1991
Periclimenes alexanderi X. Li, 2008
Periclimenes amethysteus (Risso, 1826)
Periclimenes andresi Macpherson, 1988
Periclimenes antipathophilus Spotte, Heard & Bubucis, 1994
Periclimenes batei (Borradaile, 1917)
Periclimenes boucheti X. Li, Mitsuhashi & Chan, 2008
Periclimenes bowmani Chace, 1972
Periclimenes brevicarpalis (Schenkel, 1902)
Periclimenes brevinaris Nobili, 1906
Periclimenes brevirostris Bruce, 1991
Periclimenes brucei Duriš, 1990
Periclimenes burrup Bruce, 2007
Periclimenes calcaratus Chace & Bruce, 1993
Periclimenes calmani Tattersal, 1921
Periclimenes canalinsulae Bruce & Coombes, 1997
Periclimenes cannaphilus Komai, Nemoto & Tsuchida, 2010
Periclimenes carinidactylus Bruce, 1969
Periclimenes chacei X. Li, Bruce & Manning, 2004
Periclimenes colemani Bruce, 1975
Periclimenes colesi De Grave & Anker, 2009
Periclimenes commensalis Borradaile, 1915
Periclimenes compressus Borradaile, 1915
Periclimenes consobrinus (De Man, 1902)
Periclimenes coriolis Bruce, 1985
Periclimenes crinoidalis Chace, 1969
Periclimenes cristimanus Bruce, 1965
Periclimenes crosnieri X. Li & Bruce, 2006
Periclimenes curvirostris Kubo, 1940
Periclimenes dardanicola Bruce & Okuno, 2006
Periclimenes delagoae Barnard, 1958
Periclimenes dentidactylus Bruce, 1984
Periclimenes difficilis Bruce, 1976
Periclimenes digitalis Kemp, 1922
Periclimenes diversipes Kemp, 1922
Periclimenes eleftherioui Koukouras & Türkay, 1996
Periclimenes exederens Bruce, 1969
Periclimenes fenneri Bruce, 2005
Periclimenes fimbriatus (Borradaile, 1915)
Periclimenes finlayi Chace, 1972
Periclimenes forcipulatus Bruce, 1991
Periclimenes foresti Bruce, 1981
Periclimenes forgesi X. Li & Bruce, 2006
Periclimenes foveolatus Bruce, 1981
Periclimenes fujinoi Bruce, 1990
Periclimenes gonioporae Bruce, 1989
Periclimenes granulatus Holthuis, 1950
Periclimenes granulimanus Bruce, 1978
Periclimenes granuloides Hayashi in Baba, Hayashi & Toriyama, 1986
Periclimenes guarapari De Grave, 2008
Periclimenes harringtoni Lebour, 1949
Periclimenes hertwigi Balss, 1913
Periclimenes hongkongensis Bruce, 1969
Periclimenes hydrothermophilus Hayashi & Ohtomi, 2001
Periclimenes imperator Bruce, 1967
Periclimenes incertus Borradaile, 1915
Periclimenes infraspinis (Rathbun, 1902)
Periclimenes ingressicolumbi Berggren & Svane, 1989
Periclimenes inornatus Kemp, 1922
Periclimenes investigatoris Kemp, 1922
Periclimenes involens Bruce, 1996
Periclimenes iridescens Lebour, 1949
Periclimenes ischiospinosus Bruce, 1991
Periclimenes josephi X. Li, 2008
Periclimenes jugalis Holthuis, 1952
Periclimenes kallisto Bruce, 2008
Periclimenes kempi Bruce, 1969
Periclimenes kornii (Lo Bianco, 1903)
Periclimenes laccadivensis (Alcock & Anderson, 1894)
Periclimenes laevimanus Duriš, 2010
Periclimenes lanipes Kemp, 1922
Periclimenes latipollex Kemp, 1922
Periclimenes lepidus Bruce, 1978
Periclimenes leptodactylus Bruce, 1991
Periclimenes leptopus Kemp, 1922
Periclimenes leptunguis X. Li, Mitsuhashi & Chan, 2008
Periclimenes longimanus (Dana, 1852)
Periclimenes longipes (Stimpson, 1860)
Periclimenes loyautensis X. Li & Bruce, 2006
Periclimenes macrophthalmus Fujino & Miyake, 1970
Periclimenes madreporae Bruce, 1969
Periclimenes magnus Holthuis, 1951
Periclimenes mahei Bruce, 1969
Periclimenes maldivensis Bruce, 1969
Periclimenes manihine Bruce, 2006
Periclimenes mclaughlinae Fransen, 2006
Periclimenes mclellandi Heard & Spotte, 1997
Periclimenes meyeri Chace, 1969
Periclimenes milleri Bruce, 1986
Periclimenes murcielagensis Vargas, 2000
Periclimenes nevillei Bruce, 2010
Periclimenes ngi X. Li, Mitsuhashi & Chan, 2008
Periclimenes nomadophila Berggren, 1994
Periclimenes novaffinis Bruce & Coombes, 1997
Periclimenes obscurus Kemp, 1922
Periclimenes ordinarius Bruce, 1991
Periclimenes ornatellus Bruce, 1979
Periclimenes ornatus Bruce, 1969
Periclimenes paivai Chace, 1969
Periclimenes pandionis Holthuis, 1951
Periclimenes panglaonis X. Li, Mitsuhashi & Chan, 2008
Periclimenes paralcocki X. Li & Bruce, 2006
Periclimenes paraleator X. Li & Bruce, 2006
Periclimenes paraparvus Bruce, 1969
Periclimenes parvispinatus Bruce, 1990
Periclimenes parvus Borradaile, 1898
Periclimenes patae Heard & Spotte, 1991
Periclimenes pauper Holthuis, 1951
Periclimenes pectiniferus Holthuis, 1952
Periclimenes pectinipes Bruce, 1991
Periclimenes perlucidus Bruce, 1969
Periclimenes perryae Chace, 1942
Periclimenes perturbans Bruce, 1978
Periclimenes pholeter Holthuis, 1973
Periclimenes platalea Holthuis, 1951
Periclimenes platydactylus X. Li, 2008
Periclimenes platyrhynchus Bruce, 1991
Periclimenes polynesiensis X. Li, 2008
Periclimenes poriphilus Bruce, 2010
Periclimenes poupini Bruce, 1989
Periclimenes pseudalcocki X. Li & Bruce, 2006
Periclimenes rathbunae Schmitt, 1924
Periclimenes rectirostris Bruce, 1981
Periclimenes rex Kemp, 1922
Periclimenes richeri Bruce, 1990
Periclimenes robustus (Borradaile, 1915)
Periclimenes ruber Bruce, 1982
Periclimenes sagittifer (Norman, 1861)
Periclimenes sandybrucei Mitsuhashi & Chan, 2009
Periclimenes sandyi De Grave, 2009
Periclimenes sarkanae Bruce, 2007
Periclimenes scriptus (Risso, 1822)
Periclimenes sibogae Holthuis, 1952
Periclimenes sinensis Bruce, 1969
Periclimenes soror Nobili, 1904
Periclimenes tangeroa Bruce, 2005
Periclimenes tenellus (Smith, 1882)
Periclimenes terangeri Bruce, 1998
Periclimenes thermohydrophilus Hayashi & Ohtomi, 2001
Periclimenes toloensis Bruce, 1969
Periclimenes tonga Bruce, 1988
Periclimenes uniunguiculatus Bruce, 1990
Periclimenes vaubani Bruce, 1990
Periclimenes veleronis Holthuis, 1951
Periclimenes vicinus X. Li, 2008
Periclimenes watamuae Bruce, 1976
Periclimenes wirtzi d'Udekem d'Acoz, 1996
Periclimenes yaldwyni Holthuis, 1959
Periclimenes yucatanicus (Ives, 1891)
Periclimenes zanzibaricus Bruce, 1967
Periclimenes zevinae Duriš, 1990

Habitat 
Periclimenes is widely distributed throughout tropical and temperate reef ecosystems of the Atlantic, Caribbean, Mediterranean, as well as Indo-Pacific Oceans.

Behavior

Symbiosis, commensalism, and parasitism 
Many species of Periclimenes are commensal and often symbiotic organisms within their reef ecosystems.  The most common organisms forming symbiotic relationships with this genus are species of fish, cnidarians, echinoderms, and sponges. Some species such as Periclimenes caraibicus have been observed to interact parasitically with species of sponges, living within the sponge and directly eating the sponge tissue. Another species, Periclimenes soror, is commonly found on a species of sea star known as cushion stars with no effect on the star making it a commensalistic relationship.  Anecdotal evidence suggests that P. soror may choose a host star that matches its own coloration for camouflage. Other research demonstrated that the Periclimenes species, P. yucatanicus, has a symbiotic cleaning relationship with different species of reef fish studied in the pacific. P. yucatanicus performed a waving motion with its antennae to signal to reef fish that it is available to clean.  The cleaner shrimps then ate parasitic organisms present on the reef fish species.

Characteristics 
Species present in this genus typically have a transparent to semi transparent body with antennae protruding from the head region.  Additionally, large variation of color and patterns exist on the organisms throughout, making them highly sought out ornamental species in the marine aquarium industry.

References

Palaemonidae
Taxa named by Oronzio Gabriele Costa